Robin W. Dennell  (born 1947) is a British prehistoric archaeologist specialising in early hominin expansions out of Africa and the Palaeolithic of Pakistan and China. He is Professor Emeritus of Human Origins of the University of Sheffield, and an honorary professor at the University of Exeter.

Education and career 
Dennell studied at the University of Cambridge, where he received a bachelor's degree in 1969 and a PhD in 1977. His doctoral thesis was titled, Early farming in South Bulgaria: 6th to 3rd Millenium b.c., and was published as a volume in the British Archaeological Reports International Series in 1978.

He joined the University of Sheffield in 1973, and became a senior lecturer in 1983, a reader in 1994, and a professor in 1995. He was also the Field Director of the British Archaeological Mission to Pakistan between 1988 and 1999, and the head of the archaeology department at Sheffield between 1999 and 2002. After taking voluntary redundancy from Sheffield in 2009, Dennell joined the University of Exeter as an honorary professor in 2013.

Dennell was elected a Fellow of the British Academy in 2012, and is a member of the International Council on Monuments and Sites.

Selected publications

References 

Date of birth missing (living people)
1947 births
Living people
20th-century archaeologists
21st-century archaeologists
20th-century British writers
21st-century British writers
Place of birth missing (living people)
British archaeologists
Prehistorians
Academics of the University of Sheffield
Academics of the University of Exeter
Alumni of the University of Cambridge
Fellows of the British Academy